À travers Lausanne was a professional road cycling race held annually in Lausanne, Switzerland.

The race was originally a one-day hill climb, but in 1968, it was changed to consist of two stages: a time trial and a hill climb.

Winners

References

Cycle races in Switzerland
Recurring sporting events established in 1940
Recurring sporting events disestablished in 2001
1940 establishments in Switzerland
2001 disestablishments in Switzerland
Defunct cycling races in Switzerland